Robin Trainor (25 April 1934 – 2020 or 2021) was a Northern Irish association footballer. He played as an outside right for Coleraine F.C., and won five Northern Ireland amateur caps (1958–1959), and two Irish League caps (1957–1958), and was a non-travelling member of the 1958 World Cup squad. Trainor died in late 2020 or early 2021.

References

External links
Northern Ireland's Footballing Greats

1934 births
2020s deaths
Association footballers from Northern Ireland
Association football forwards
1958 FIFA World Cup players
Coleraine F.C. players